Pascal Vahirua (born 9 March 1966) is a French former professional footballer who played as a winger. His career was intimately connected with AJ Auxerre. Vahirua appeared for the France national team at Euro 1992.

Club career
Vahirua was born in Papeete, Tahiti, French Polynesia. Discovered by legendary club manager Guy Roux, who was vacationing in the island, he moved to AJ Auxerre's youth academy in 1982, aged 16, going on to amass nearly 400 official appearances for the club in nine full professional seasons and making his Ligue 1 debut on 25 September 1984 in a 3–1 home win against Stade Brestois 29.

During the 90s, speedy Vahirua was part of a solid team whose attacking unit also included Gérald Baticle, Christophe Cocard and Corentin Martins. They reached the semi-finals of the 1992–93 UEFA Cup, losing on penalties to Borussia Dortmund. He left the team in 1995 – precisely the year they would go on to achieve a historic double – with only the 1994 edition of the French Cup to his credit.

In the following seven seasons, Vahirua represented Stade Malherbe Caen, Atromitos F.C. in Greece and Tours FC, retiring professionally in 2002. He played amateur football for three more years in the city of Auxerre, with neighbours Stade Auxerrois and AJ's reserves, after which he took charge of football development in the area, which included the club's youth sides.

International career
Vahirua earned his first cap for France on 21 January 1990, in a friendly home with Kuwait (1–0), and scored his only goal in another exhibition game, against Belgium in preparation for the UEFA Euro 1992 (3–3), on 25 March.

Summoned for the final stages by Michel Platini, the coach who also gave him his debut, Vahirua played twice in an eventual group stage exit, and was also part of the nation's infamous 1994 FIFA World Cup qualification campaign, in which they lost their last two home matches. With a total of 22 internationals, he was the first ever Polynesian to don the French shirt.

Personal life
Vahirua is cousin to another footballer and winger, Marama Vahirua. He was brought up in another famed academy in France, FC Nantes.

Honours
Auxerre
Coupe de France: 1993–94
Coupe Gambardella: 1985
Championnat National: 1985–86

References

External links
 
 
 

1966 births
Living people
People from Papeete
French footballers
French Polynesian footballers
Association football wingers
Ligue 1 players
Ligue 2 players
AJ Auxerre players
Stade Malherbe Caen players
Tours FC players
Atromitos F.C. players
France international footballers
UEFA Euro 1992 players
French expatriate footballers
French Polynesian expatriate footballers
Expatriate footballers in Greece
French expatriate sportspeople in Greece